Many writers make references to Sir Arthur Conan Doyle's famous literary creation, the detective Sherlock Holmes, and these often become embedded within popular culture. While Holmes exists predominantly in the context of Victorian-era London, he has been mentioned in such outre contexts as the 22nd century or hunting aliens or supernatural enemies.  These references are in addition to the innumerable passing references to Sherlock Holmes made in many literary and cinematic works, such as the labeling of a person as a "Sherlock", whether in reference to their intelligence (or in jest or sarcasm).

Books
One of the first attempts was made in response to the "Great Hiatus" (when Arthur Conan Doyle decided not to write any more Holmes stories, to the dismay of his fans).  Stepping into the breach, John Kendrick Bangs wrote Pursuit of the House-Boat (1897) [a sequel to his A House-Boat on the Styx(1895)], in which a deceased gentleman's clubhouse boat is stolen, whereupon Holmes arrives to help his fellow-deceased track down the boat by chartering a ship from Hades to London. Bangs' version of Holmes then comments to himself:
"For now," he said, with a chuckle, "I can get back to earth again free of cost on my own hook, whether my eminent inventor wants me there or not.  I never approved of his killing me off as he did at the very height of my popularity."
However, in 1894, Conan Doyle decided to return to writing, bringing Holmes back from the dead by claiming he had faked his death in "The Empty House".  While Bangs' attempt was reverential, Maurice Leblanc decided to write the short story "Sherlock Holmes arrive trop tard" ("Sherlock Holmes Arrives Too Late"). In it, Holmes meets the young thief Lupin for a brief time, unaware that he is, in fact, Lupin. After legal objections from Conan Doyle, the name was changed to "Herlock Sholmès" with the pseudonym "Holmlock Shears" in the earliest English versions. Holmes returned in two more stories collected in Volume 2, Arsène Lupin contre Herlock Sholmès, having opened the floodgates to less flattering versions of Holmes. One of the more recent parodies in print is "The Lord Mike Saga", wherein Mycroft Miles (née Mills) is the Holmes figure, with the titles reflecting the styles: "A Study in Varlets", "The Strange Case of the Moth-Eater of Clapham Common", "Happy Times and Places", and "A Cameo Broached". Miles refuses to speak of Holmes, referring to him only as "the other chap".

Frequent speculation as to the "real" Holmes has existed since publication, and Mark Frost's novel The List of Seven (1993) and its sequel The Six Messiahs (1995) are not the first to put a spin on this.  Frost has Sir Arthur Conan Doyle as its main character and tells the (fictional) story of how Doyle's Holmes was inspired by Johnathon Sparks, a mysterious man who saves Doyle's life from a mad occultist.  The Wold Newton family series connects multiple famous fictional characters together to a mail coach that passed a radioactive asteroid in the eighteenth century - Holmes is a descendant of one of the travelers in that coach.

Stage
Holmes is portrayed in Mysterious Circumstances by Michael Mitnick.
 Holmes is portrayed in Sherlock's Last Case by Charles Marowitz.

Cinema

Some of the earliest films use Holmes as a character, notably the early films of William Gillette, the American actor who played Holmes in various plays.  
The Return of Sherlock Holmes (1929) is an early "talkie".

Later films would blur the lines between canon and non-canon, however.  
In the sci-fi film Time After Time (1979), H.G. Wells uses a time machine to go to 1979 America; he tries to use Sherlock Holmes as a false name, thinking the literary character would be forgotten by then. 
From 1984 to 1985, Japan's Tokyo Movie Shinsha and the Italian TV station RAI released 26 episodes of Sherlock Hound, a show featuring anthropomorphic dogs in various roles in the Sherlock Holmes world. 
Walt Disney Pictures released The Great Mouse Detective (July 2, 1986), wherein the character of Holmes is borrowed by a mouse. The name "Basil" is no mere coincidence: one of Holmes's aliases in the original Conan Doyle stories is "Captain Basil". Also, the actor Basil Rathbone famously portrayed Holmes on film. The film is based on the Basil of Baker Street novels.
Continuing the print tradition of goodnatured irreverence, the comedy film Without a Clue (1988) presents the premise that Holmes was a fictional creation of John Watson's, who was the true deductive genius.  Once the character becomes popular, Watson is forced to hire an out-of-work actor to play Holmes.
In the movie The Phantom of Baker Street (2002), Conan goes into a virtual Victorian London a computer simulated Holmes and Watson don't appear due to working on another case (Hound of the Baskervilles), but Moriarty and Irene Adler do.
In the movie Boomerang (1947), an editorial cartoon mocks the police's efforts to solve a murder by depicting them as a group of amateur Sherlock Holmeses.

Television
 The 'Alvin and the Chipmunks episode "Elementary, My Dear Simon" (1988) has Simon in the role of Holmes, Theodore as Dr. Watson, and Alvin as Moriarty.
 In the 1990 series Peter Pan and the Pirates, the episode "Elementary, my Dear Pan" is where Peter assumes the 'Holmes' persona to find his missing pan-pipe, with John as 'Watson' and Hook as 'Moriarty'.
 On Star Trek: The Next Generation the character Data studies and portrays the character of Sherlock Holmes.
In the VeggieTales episode "Sheerluck Holmes and the Golden Ruler", Larry the Cucumber play the roles of Sheerluck Holmes and his assistant Dr. Watson. In this parody Sheerluck is portrayed as a dimwit who is credited for solving cases usually solved by the more intelligent Watson, and his early refusal to acknowledge his partner leads to a brief rift between the two.
In The Fairly Odd Parents episode "Shelf Life", Sherlock makes an appearance because Timmy summoned him to write his book report even replying Let's just poof Mr.Fancy hat out here. Sherlock doesn't want to even replying "Are you dumb? I'm a detective not a babysitter". Then he leaves to Timmy's house. When Timmy got his grades at the end of the episode for stopping Tom Sawyer. Timmy forgets something which was putting him back in his book. Then the camera pans he is with Mr and Mrs. Turner.
In the Phineas and Ferb episode "Elementary My Dear Stacy", Candace and Stacy read every story about Sherlock Holmes and Candace adopts the classic deerstalker hat and behaves like a less-qualified Sherlock Holmes.
 In the sci-fi/paranormal TV show Fringe, two references are made to Sherlock Holmes in two different episodes: "6955 kHz" and "The Consultant". In "6955 kHz", Walter Bishop tells his son Peter, "That was very Sherlock Holmes of you just then," and then tells FBI agent Astrid Farnsworth, "That would make you Watson, dear." Later, when Astrid begins to figure out that a series of numbers translate to a series of geographical coordinates, Walter asks, "What are you thinking, Watson?" In "The Consultant", Walter makes a reference to "the dog that didn't bark," recounting the Sherlock Holmes case of "The Adventure of Silver Blaze" and hinting at a mole due to a conspicuous lack of evidence.
 The Backyardigans episode "Whodunit" "Whodunit" (2006), in which Pablo dresses like Holmes and undergoes a mystery that reflects the style the 'Holmes' books.

Sherlock Holmes appears in
 The Teenage Mutant Ninja Turtles cartoon series episode "Elementary, My Dear Turtle" (1987).
 The BraveStarr cartoon series two-part episode "Sherlock Holmes in the 23rd Century" (1988).
 The Slimer! and the Real Ghostbusters episode "Elementary, My Dear Winston" (1989), in which Holmes, Watson, and Moriarty are literally brought to life by a strong belief held in them by the world's population. Though not ghosts, they do not have physical bodies.
 The Batman: The Brave and the Bold episode "Trials of the Demon!" (2009).
 Murdoch Mysteries's Season 6 episode "A Study in Sherlock" "A Study in Sherlock" (2013) and Season 7 episode "Return of Sherlock Holmes" "Return of Sherlock Holmes" (2013) both feature David Kingsley, a man deluded into believing he's Sherlock Holmes and often helps Murdoch in his investigations.
 Family Guy's 13th episode of the 16th season entitled "V Is for Mystery" (2018) featured Stewie Griffin as Holmes, Brian Griffin as Watson and Peter Griffin as Moriarty. The whole episode was a Sherlock Holmes parody.
 The Scooby-Doo and Guess Who? episode "Elementary, My Dear Shaggy" (2019) is where the gang meets a man who claims to be Sherlock Holmes, who helps them investigate London's 'Screaming Skulls' while referring to Shaggy as Mrs. Hudson and Velma as Watson.

Video games
 Robin of Sherlock for Amstrad CPC and ZX Spectrum is a 1985 video game (a parody: the game is not sherlockian) that mixes the universes of Sherlock Holmes and Robin Hood. 
 Wizard101's world Marleybone stars Sherlock Bones, and Dr. Meowiarty as a reference to Holmes and Moriarty.
 Pirate101, Wizard101's sister game, also features Dr. Meowiarty as Professor Moriarty and Sherlock's brother Mycroft Bones as Mycroft Holmes in the world of Marleybone.
 Mario Party Advance, a video game released in 2005, includes a character named Shroomlock, a mushroom version of Sherlock Holmes.
 Detective Pikachu has a lot of references to Sherlock Holmes stories.Dr. Doyle & The Mystery Of The Cloche Hat is a 2017 video game by PnC Narratives set in Southern England which features mystery themes and main character's name is inspired by Arthur Conan Doyle.
 The Ace Attorney series makes frequent references to Sherlock Holmes, including the main protagonist Phoenix Wright occasionally calling himself "Sherlock Holmes II". Holmes also makes an appearance in the spinoff The Great Ace Attorney: Adventures, but his name was changed in the English localization to "Herlock Sholmes" in order to avoid copyright issues.
 The 2015 video game Assassin's Creed Syndicate, set in Victorian London, features several references to Sherlock Holmes, including an outfit inspired by the character that can be worn by one of the protagonists, Jacob Frye, and a downloadable content (DLC) expansion titled The Dreadful Crimes, which has the player do detective work to solve a range of murders. A fictionalized version of Arthur Conan Doyle also makes an appearance in the DLC.

 Comics 
In the Italian comic book Martin Mystère and spin-off series Storie da Altrove/Stories from Elsewhere Holmes is presented as a historical character. In late 1880s he worked on the case of Jack the Ripper and met professor Richard Van Helsing, a vampire who destroyed Count Dracula. 
Along with Professor Challenger, Holmes visited a secret valley of dinosaurs in South America in 1896, which became the basis for Doyle's novel The Lost World. The same year he worked with the American Secret Service "Elsewhere" to stop paranormal threats from another dimension. In 1910 he discovered a life extension serum. At the beginning of World War I he had a final confrontation with Professor Moriarty. After the war, he moved to Ukraine, giving Arthur Conan Doyle the task to convince everyone that he was just an imaginary character. With the help of his serum, Holmes prolonged his life for several decades. In 1990s he indirectly helped Martin Mystère to capture a villain who found a formula of his serum.

 Music 
The song "Dr. Watson and Mr. Holmes" (1943) by American jazz string band Spirits of Rhythm imagines a comic dialogue between the two title characters.
 Sherlock Holmes is the subject matter in the song "Sherlock Holmes" by American rock band Sparks, on their eleventh album Angst in My Pants.
 "Searchin'" (1957), a song recorded iby the R&B group The Coasters, makes reference to Holmes and other fictional detectives.
 The Kinks song "Village Green Preservation Society" name checks both Sherlock Holmes and Moriarty.
 The B. A. Robertson song, "Bang Bang" name checks Sherlock Holmes.
 The Arctic Monkeys song, "A Certain Romance" name checks Sherlock Holmes.

 Spoken word 
 The Firesign Theatre's comedy record, The Tale of the Giant Rat of Sumatra'' (1974), parodies Holmes, featuring a character named Hemlock Stones.

Theme parks 
Holmes's profile appears in a window in Disneyland's Mr. Toad's Wild Ride.

Further reading

References

Sherlock Holmes
Sherlock Holmes